The Jalali calendar is a solar calendar, was compiled during the reign of Jalaluddin Malik-Shah I of Seljuk by the order of Nizam al-Mulk and the place of observation were the cities of Isfahan (the capital of the Seljuks), Rey, and Nishapur. Variants of the Jalali calendar are still in use today in Iran and Afghanistan. In Iran, the Persian names of the zodiac are used while in Afghanistan the original Arabic names are used. It gains approximately 1 day on the Julian calendar every 128 years. 

The tropical Jalali calendar, which inherited some aspects from the Yazdgerdi calendar, was adopted on 15 March 1079 by the Seljuk Sultan Jalal al-Din Malik Shah I (for whom it was named), based on the recommendations of a committee of astronomers, including Omar Khayyam, at the imperial observatory in his capital city of Isfahan. Month computations were based on solar transits through the zodiac. It remained in use for eight centuries. It arose out of dissatisfaction with the seasonal drift in the Islamic calendar which is due to that calendar being lunar instead of solar; a lunar year of 354 days, while acceptable to a desert nomad people, proved to be unworkable for settled, agricultural peoples, and the Iranian calendar is one of several non-lunar calendars adopted by settled Muslims for agricultural purposes (others include the Coptic calendar, the Julian calendar, and the Semitic calendars of the Near East). Sultan Jalal commissioned the task in 1073. Its work was completed well before the Sultan's death in 1092, after which the observatory would be abandoned.

The year was computed from the March equinox (Nowruz), and each month was determined by the transit of the sun into the corresponding zodiac region, a system that incorporated improvements on the fourth-century-CE Indian system of the Surya Siddhanta (Surya=solar, Siddhanta=analysis), also the basis of most Hindu calendars. Since the solar transit times can have 24-hour variations, the length of the months vary slightly in different years (each month can be between 29 and 32 days). For example, the months in the two last years of the Jalali calendar had:
 1303 AP: 30, 31, 32, 31, 32, 30, 31, 30, 29, 30, 29, and 30 days,
 1302 AP: 30, 31, 32, 31, 31, 31, 31, 29, 30, 29, 30, and 30 days.

Because months were computed based on precise times of solar transit between zodiacal regions, seasonal drift never exceeded one day, and also there was no need for a leap year in the Jalali calendar.  However, this calendar was very difficult to compute; it required full ephemeris computations and actual observations to determine the apparent movement of the Sun.  

Some claim that simplifications introduced in the intervening years may have introduced a system with eight leap days in every cycle of 33 years.  (Different rules, such as the 2820-year cycle, have also been accredited to Khayyam).  However, the original Jalali calendar based on observations (or predictions) of solar transit would not have needed either leap years or seasonal adjustments.

Owing to the variations in month lengths, and also the difficulty in computing the calendar itself, the Iranian calendar was modified to simplify these aspects in 1925 (1304 AP), resulting in the Solar Hijri calendar.

References

See also 
 Iranian calendars
 Solar Hijri calendar
 Armenian calendar

Calendar eras
Specific calendars
Zoroastrian calendar